Marta de Villlonga (born 1960 in Barcelona) is a Spanish designer from Catalonia.

Life and work

The daughter of painter Jesús Carles de Vilallonga and Madeleine Kirouac, she studied fashion design at Studio Berçot and industrial design at ESDI, both in Paris. She then worked on sets and costumes for the French cinema industry. In 1988 and 1989, she worked at Richard Meier's workshop in New York City, on furniture and interior design projects. In 1990 she started working with architect Ricardo Bofill and his firm Ricardo Bofill Taller de Arquitectura (RBTA), and also became Bofill's long-term partner. 

She has also produced designs under her own name.

In 2020, she curated a show of paintings by her late father at the  exhibition venue of Fundació Vila Casas in Barcelona, titled Vilallonga: The Inner Eye.

See also
 List of works by Ricardo Bofill Taller de Arquitectura

Notes

Spanish interior designers
Spanish industrial designers